Vivian Barbot (born July 7, 1941) is a Canadian teacher, activist, and politician. She is a former president of the Fédération des femmes du Québec, a former Member of Parliament and former vice-president of the Bloc Québécois. She was the party's interim leader and president following the resignation of Gilles Duceppe in May 2011. Barbot became the first person of a visible minority group to lead a Canadian federal political party with parliamentary representation.

Barbot was born in Saint-Marc, Haiti. She is the former Member of Parliament for the riding of Papineau. In the 2006 election, she scored a significant victory for the Bloc by defeating former Liberal Cabinet Minister Pierre Pettigrew, but was defeated two years later in the 2008 federal election by Justin Trudeau. Barbot ran against Trudeau in the 2011 election, but was once again defeated.

The 2011 election also saw the defeat of Gilles Duceppe and all but four Bloc MPs. As vice-president of the party, Barbot was appointed interim party leader and president following Duceppe's resignation and remained in the position until Duceppe's successor, Daniel Paillé, was elected on December 11, 2011.

Election results

	

Note: Mr. Baig's share of popular vote as an independent candidate is compared to his share in the 2006 general election as a Canadian Action Party candidate.

References

External links
 

1941 births
Living people
Bloc Québécois MPs
Black Canadian politicians
Women members of the House of Commons of Canada
Members of the House of Commons of Canada from Quebec
Trade unionists from Quebec
Haitian Quebecers
Haitian emigrants to Canada
Women in Quebec politics
Black Canadian women
Canadian people of Haitian descent
21st-century Canadian politicians
21st-century Canadian women politicians
Canadian women trade unionists